Football at the 2019 Pacific Games was held on 8–20 July in Apia in Samoa.

In the men's football tournament, the gold medal was won by New Zealand's under-23 team.

The women's tournament was won by Papua New Guinea, the country's fifth successive gold medal in women's football – Papua New Guinea have won every edition of the event since it began at the Pacific Games in 2003. The silver medal was the first ever honour for the Samoa women's national football team.

Medal summary

Medal table

Results

See also
 Football at the Pacific Games

References

External links
Official 2019 Pacific Games website
XV Pacific Games Men's Tournament, Official OFC website
XV Pacific Games Women's Tournament, Official OFC website

 
2019 Pacific Games
Pacific Games
2019
2019 Pacific Games